Bayan al-Saada fi Maqamat al-Ibada (Arabic: The Elucidation of Felicity concerning the Stations of Worship) is an exegesis on the Qur'an by Ni'matullāhī Sufi leader Sultan Ali Shah in Arabic. This 19th century commentary is believed to be marking an epoch in the history of modern Shii Sufism by serving as a hermeneutic bridge between the pre-modern and modern stages of Shii mystical exegesis.

Exegetic approach
This exegesis of the entire Qur'an is written from the Shi'i mystical viewpoint. In his tafsir, Sultan 'Ali Shah included exoteric as well as Sufi commentary.

See also
Qur'an
Qur'anic exegesis (Tafsir)
List of tafsir works

References

Shia tafsir
 Sufi tafsir